KRCW-TV (channel 32) is a television station licensed to Salem, Oregon, United States, serving as the CW outlet for the Portland area. It is owned and operated by network majority owner Nexstar Media Group alongside CBS affiliate KOIN (channel 6). Both stations share studios in the basement of the KOIN Center skyscraper on Southwest Columbia Street in downtown Portland, while KRCW-TV's transmitter is located in the Sylvan-Highlands neighborhood of the city.

Previously, KRCW-TV maintained separate studios on Southwest Arctic Drive in Beaverton, while KOIN's facilities only housed KRCW-TV's master control and some internal operations. Despite Salem being KRCW-TV's city of license, the station maintains no physical presence there.

History

Early history
The station was launched on May 8, 1989, under the call sign KUTF (standing for "Keep Up the Faith"), its original transmitter was located outside Molalla. The station's original programming format almost entirely consisted of religious programs. It was originally operated by Dove Broadcasting, owner of Christian television station WGGS-TV in Greenville, South Carolina; local productions included a version of WGGS's popular Nite Line talk program.

Despite its long legacy in Christian television (its flagship has been on the air since 1972), Dove struggled to build a support base for KUTF. In May 1990, the station went dark. According to station insiders, the Jim Bakker and Jimmy Swaggart scandals gave potential supporters pause. It did not help matters that the station had received competition a few months after signing on from KNMT, with wealthier ownership (Trinity Broadcasting Network, through subsidiary National Minority Television) and a stronger signal.

KUTF resumed broadcasting a month later. Dove sold KUTF to Eagle Broadcasting on July 17, 1991. The call sign was changed to KEBN on February 11, 1992; the new owners then proceeded to relaunch the station as "Oregon's New Eagle 32", becoming a general entertainment independent. On October 12, KEBN went dark again, citing the need to concentrate on moving its operation from Salem to Beaverton. While initially planned as a four-week silent period, it would be nearly two years before the station returned. By late 1993, a receiver had been appointed for the licensee, Willamette Valley Broadcasting, Ltd.

The receiver filed to sell KEBN to Channel 32, Inc., at the end of 1993. Under the leadership of Victor Ives, Channel 32, Inc. moved all operations to Portland and secured an affiliation with The WB. The station resumed broadcasting in the summer of 1994, airing a number of infomercials, public domain movies, and brokered shows for eight hours a day; the station expanded to 24-hour broadcasting on Labor Day, and on October 2, 1995, it took the call letters KWBP, reflecting its new affiliation.

By the fall of 1995, bartered syndicated programming (including cartoons, and some older sitcoms and dramas) were added to the station's schedule. It also relayed the O. J. Simpson trial from future sister station KTLA in Los Angeles. After becoming a WB affiliate, KWBP significantly upgraded its on-air look and schedule. It acquired several first-run syndicated sitcoms and talk shows. It grew even further after being purchased by ACME Communications in 1997. At that point, a low-power relay, KWBP-LP (originally operating on channel 4, now on channel 5) was established in Downtown Portland to address signal issues in that area. By the start of the new millennium, KWBP had established itself as a solid competitor to established non-Big Three stations KPTV (channel 12) and KPDX (channel 49).

Tribune ownership
On December 30, 2002, ACME sold KWBP and KPLR-TV in St. Louis, Missouri to the Tribune Company for $270 million ($70 million of which was declared as the purchase price for KWBP); the sale was finalized on March 21, 2003. KWBP's growth continued, especially with KPDX's parent company Meredith Corporation purchasing KPTV and absorbing both that station's Fox affiliation and news operation into KPTV, leaving new UPN affiliate KPDX a weakened rival in the aftermath.

On January 24, 2006, the Warner Bros. unit of Time Warner and CBS Corporation announced that the two companies would shut down The WB and UPN and combine the networks' respective programming to create a new "fifth" network called The CW. KWBP was announced as Portland's CW affiliate through a 16-station group affiliation agreement with Tribune, while KPDX was named as the Portland affiliate of MyNetworkTV (another new network created by News Corporation as a result of the formation of The CW).

On September 16, 2006, KWBP changed its call letters to the current KRCW-TV. It affiliated with The CW when it launched on September 18, 2006, KPDX affiliate with MyNetworkTV (which launched on September 5). On April 6, 2009, KRCW joined other Tribune-owned CW affiliates in phasing out the network's branding from the station's own on-air brand, referring to itself as "Northwest 32 TV," or "NW 32 TV" for short. The station reinstated CW branding in August 2012, rebranding as "Portland's CW 32."

Aborted sale to Sinclair; sale to Nexstar
On May 8, 2017, Sinclair Broadcast Group—owner of ABC affiliate KATU (channel 2) and Univision affiliate KUNP (channel 16)—entered into an agreement to acquire Tribune Media for $3.9 billion, plus the assumption of $2.7 billion in debt held by Tribune, pending regulatory approval by the FCC and the U.S. Department of Justice's Antitrust Division. The creation of an additional duopoly in the Portland market would result in only seven full-power television owners. Under the previous rules, the companies would have been required to sell either KATU or KRCW to another station group in order to comply with Federal Communications Commission (FCC) ownership rules preceding approval of the acquisition (KUNP would not be affected as its contours do not overlap either station); however, a change in local ownership rules permitted duopolies in all markets (provided only one of the stations ranks in the top four), hence the duopoly became permissible. As a result, KRCW would become a sister station to KATU.

On August 9, 2018, Tribune announced it would terminate the Sinclair deal, intending to seek other M&A opportunities. Tribune also filed a breach of contract lawsuit in the Delaware Chancery Court, alleging that Sinclair engaged in protracted negotiations with the FCC and the U.S. Department of Justice's Antitrust Division over regulatory issues, refused to sell stations in markets where it already had properties, and proposed divestitures to parties with ties to Sinclair executive chair David D. Smith that were rejected or highly subject to rejection to maintain control over stations it was required to sell.

On December 3, 2018, Irving, Texas–based Nexstar Media Group—which has owned CBS affiliate KOIN (channel 6) since January 2017—announced it would acquire the assets of Tribune Media for $6.4 billion in cash and debt. Nexstar included the overlap between KOIN and KRCW-TV among the television stations in thirteen markets where the group may consider making divestitures to address national ownership cap issues related to the Tribune transaction and/or to comply with FCC local ownership rules preventing it from owning two or more stations in the same market. However, KRCW does not rank among the four highest-rated stations in the Portland market in total day viewership, and FCC regulations no longer preclude legal duopolies that would leave fewer than eight independently owned television stations in a single market (a KOIN/KRCW combination would leave only seven full-power commercial television stations with independent ownership remaining in the market, barring a second legal duopoly in the market under the previous "eight-voices test" rules repealed by the FCC in November 2017), hence there are no legal hurdles in place which would otherwise preclude a KOIN/KRCW duopoly.

The sale was approved by the FCC on September 16 and was completed on September 19, 2019. This acquisition by Nexstar effectively reunited KRCW-TV (along with KPLR-TV) with four stations that had previously been sister stations under ACME Communications ownership prior to 2003 turned CW affiliates: KUCW (formerly KUWB) in Salt Lake City, Utah, the duopoly of KWBQ and KASY-TV (the latter a MyNetworkTV affiliate) in Albuquerque, New Mexico (though both are owned by Mission Broadcasting, they have an LMA with Nexstar, and their senior partner in the agreement, dual CBS/Fox affiliate KRQE, has also been a sister station to KOIN from 1985 to 2005 and since 2014), and WBDT in Dayton, Ohio (owned by Vaughan Media, but also through an LMA with Nexstar).

Newscasts

From 2003 to 2005, NBC affiliate KGW (channel 8) produced a nightly 10 p.m. newscast called Northwest NewsChannel 8 at 10 on PAX for the area's Pax TV owned-and-operated station KPXG-TV (which is now with Pax successor Ion Television). The program was moved over to KWBP on October 3, 2005 through a news share agreement that was struck between KGW and KWBP. Renamed as Northwest NewsChannel 8 at 10 on Portland's WB, it was the first news program of any kind ever to be broadcast on this station. The program title was changed on September 18, 2006, when KRCW made the affiliation switch to The CW. On January 21, 2008, KGW became the first television station in the Portland market to begin broadcasting its local newscasts in high definition; the KRCW broadcast was included in the upgrade. On July 22, 2014, KRCW's newscast was retitled KGW News at 10 on Portland's CW 32, in accordance with KGW's retiring of the Northwest NewsChannel 8 brand after 20 years.

The prime time production originated from KGW's studios on Southwest Jefferson Street in Downtown Portland and competes with the hour-long and in-house 10 o'clock broadcast that airs on Fox affiliate KPTV (channel 12). KGW advertised the KRCW newscast as having the most important news of the day, along with an updated weather forecast in the first ten minutes of the program. In turn, KPTV promotes its broadcast as having the first weather forecast at 10. The KGW newscast on KRCW was similar to news share agreements that Tribune maintained in select other markets where a station of theirs does not operate a news department (such as the WPVI-TV-produced 10 p.m. newscast that airs on Philadelphia sister station WPHL-TV).

On September 19, 2019, CBS affiliate KOIN (channel 6) took over broadcast of the nightly 10 p.m. newscast coinciding with the station's purchase by Nexstar. Called KOIN 6 News at 10 on Portland's CW, the newscast originates from KOIN's studios located in the KOIN Center in Downtown Portland.

KRCW produced local news and weather cut-ins under the name Portland's Morning News during the Tribune-produced EyeOpener program; the cut-ins were anchored by Ken Ackerman in-studio and weather segments were anchored by Tim Joyce. On June 15, 2017, Tribune Broadcasting announced the launch of Morning Dose, a two-hour social media-focused morning show produced in partnership with Chicago-based digital content branding agency Dose, which replaced EyeOpener on the five Tribune stations carrying the latter program (KDAF, KIAH, KRCW, WDCW and WPHL). Hosted by Melissa Rycroft and Gary Striewski, with news segments anchored by Laila Muhammad (the only announced holdover from EyeOpener), the program features a mix of news stories selected by Dose through its social storytelling and scientific trend methodology to "[showcase] the content and advancing the stories that will drive the day’s social conversation." Nicole DeCosta provides in-studio lifestyle segment cut-ins for the KRCW audience.

Technical information

Subchannels 
The station's digital signal is multiplexed:

In addition to KRCW's main channel, the station's digital subchannels are carried on the digital tiers of local cable providers; digital channel 32.3 is carried on Comcast channel 303 and Frontier FiOS digital channel 463, while digital subchannel 32.2 is carried on Comcast channel 304 and Frontier FiOS digital channel 462. The This TV affiliation on digital subchannel 32.3 was added on June 25, 2012, replacing the second digital subchannel of ABC affiliate KATU as that network's affiliate for the Portland market (KATU replaced This TV on its 2.2 subchannel with the network's then-sister network MeTV).

In June 2018, KRCW added new digital channel TBD on 32.4.

ATSC 3.0 lighthouse

Analog-to-digital conversion
KRCW-TV shut down its analog signal, over UHF channel 32, on June 12, 2009, the official date in which full-power television stations in the United States transitioned from analog to digital broadcasts under federal mandate. The station's digital signal remained on its pre-transition UHF channel 33, using PSIP to display the station's virtual channel as its former UHF analog channel 32.

Translators

Former translators
In 1993, a small low-power station by the call letters K04OG was launched. It was licensed to Reedville with a transmitter on Cooper Mountain and carried programming from America One. Originally broadcasting on VHF channel 4, then-KWBP-LP moved to channel 5 when Paxson Communications petitioned the FCC to move KPXG-TV (channel 22)'s digital signal from UHF channel 20 to channel 4. On December 1, 1998, the call letters were changed to KENY-LP to reflect the founder of the station, Kenny J. Seymour. In 2000, KENY-LP was bought by ACME Communications and became a repeater station for KWBP. The transmitter was moved to Sylvan-Highlands to provide better coverage to the Downtown Portland area. The station changed its calls to KWBP-LP. In 2006, to coincide with its parent call letter change, the repeater became KRCW-LP. In 2014, KRCW-LP flash-cut to a digital signal. Nexstar surrendered KRCW-LP's license for cancellation on February 9, 2021.

The licenses for two additional translators – K20ES and K24DX, each licensed to serve Pendleton, etc. – were surrendered to the FCC and cancelled on July 13, 2021.

References

External links

The CW affiliates
Antenna TV affiliates
Grit (TV network) affiliates
Nexstar Media Group
Television channels and stations established in 1989
RCW-TV
Mass media in Salem, Oregon
1989 establishments in Oregon
ATSC 3.0 television stations